Berico Technologies is a small defense contractor based in Reston, Virginia, United States.

History 
Berico was founded in 2006 by military veterans.

In 2011, Berico Technologies spun off two companies: 42Six Solutions (later acquired by Computer Sciences Corporation) and Praescient Analytics.

In November 2012, Berico became an Authorized Systems Integrator in the Cloudera Connect partner program.

Work 
General:
Big Data Analytics
Data Science
Intelligence simulation
Cellular exploitation
Strategy consulting

Specific:
Helped a tech company with a product used by intelligence analysts
Trained soldiers in Intelligence, Surveillance, and Reconnaissance
Contracted to help the Army Intelligence Campaign Initiatives Group
Partnering with Oberon (Stanley), SAIC, and Booz Allen Hamilton
Participated in the NIST Cloud Computing Standards Roadmap Working Group
Created a Fusion tool for Department of Defense
Created a Fusion tool for a Department of Defense customer
Upgraded a military biometric ID system
Intelligence work regarding a SAR Database for the US Department of Transportation

External links 
 Black ops: how HBGary wrote backdoors for the government (by Nate Anderson, ars technica)

References 

Technology companies established in 2006
Companies based in Arlington County, Virginia
Defense companies of the United States